The women's long jump event at the 2005 Summer Universiade was held on 15–16 August in Izmir, Turkey.

Medalists

Results

Qualification

Final

References
Finals results
Full results
Qualification results

Athletics at the 2005 Summer Universiade
2005 in women's athletics
2005